Cryptocarya meissneriana, known as the thick-leaved laurel is a small tree growing in eastern Australia. The habitat is rainforest on the poorer sedimentary soils.

The natural range of distribution is from the Wangat River (32° S) in the Barrington Tops to the Logan River (27° S) in south eastern Queensland. This tree was named after Carl Meissner, a Swiss botanist.

Description 

Cryptocarya meissneriana is a small tree, reaching 10 metres in height and with a trunk diameter of 25 cm. The bark is brown, mostly smooth with vertical lines of bumps.

Leaves alternate, simple, narrow, with a prominent tip. Not particularly thick as the common name might suggest, 5 to 9 cm long. Glossy green above, paler below. Sometimes glaucous underneath. The mid vein is depressed on the upper surface and raised on the lower side of the leaf. Small branches are smooth and green.

Tiny, pale green or cream flowers form on panicles in the months of October to January. The fruit is a black fleshy drupe, around 15 mm long. Like many Australian Cryptocarya, the fruit is ribbed and pointed. Fruit matures from March to April. Regeneration from fresh seed is slow but fairly reliable. Removal of the fleshy black aril is advised to assist germination.

References

External links

Trees of Australia
Flora of New South Wales
Flora of Queensland
Laurales of Australia
meissneriana